The 4th Adelaide Film Festival took place in Adelaide, Australia, from 19 February to 1 March 2009. Katrina Sedgwick was again Festival Director. Jan Chapman received the 2009 Don Dunstan Award The poster this year depicts the iconic film festival eye character concept that was so successful in 2007.

The festival opened with My Year Without Sex directed by Sarah Watt and closed with Easy Virtue directed by Stephan Elliott. The festival presented 23 world premieres, 62 Australian premieres, 38 Australian films, 9 new Australian features from established and emerging filmmakers, and 143 films from over 49 countries. The Natuzzi International Award for Best Feature Film was won by the South Korean film Treeless Mountain, directed and written by So Yong Kim.

Competition

Jury
The following people were selected for the In Competition Jury:

 Laurence Kardish, Canadian, Senior Film Curator at MoMA (President)
 J.M. Coetzee, South African writer
 Jo Dyer, Australian film producer
 Bill Gosden, director of the New Zealand International Film Festival
 Naomi Kawase, Japanese film director
 Hannah McGill, Artistic Director of the Edinburgh International Film Festival
 David Stratton, English-Australian film critic

In Competition
The following films were selected for the In Competition section:

Awards
The Natuzzi International Award for Best Feature Film
The Natuzzi International Award for Best Feature Film was won by the South Korean film Treeless Mountain, directed and written by So Yong Kim.

Audience Award
The Audience Award for Best Feature was won by Samson & Delilah.

The Audience Award for Best Documentary was won by Kiran Bedi.

The Audience Award for Best Short was won by The Cat Piano.

Don Dunstan Award
The Don Dunstan Award was won by Jan Chapman.

References

External links
 Official Website

Adelaide Film Festival
Adelaide Film Festival
2000s in Adelaide
Adelaide Film Festival